Maullinia is a genus of intracellular, protistan parasites that infect brown algae (Phaeophyceae).

Distribution
Maullinia has been found in brown macroalgae across the Southern Hemisphere, including Chile, the Falkland Islands, Australia, New Zealand and various sub-Antarctic islands. Based on genetic evidence, Maullinia have likely been dispersed widely via transport inside of buoyant rafts of southern bull kelp.

Description

Maullinia infections have been found in filamentous brown algae such Ectocarpus siliculosus and Acinetospora, as well as in macroalgae including Macrocystis, Desmarestia, southern bull-kelp. Maullinia can cause yellow galls to develop ( in diameter).

Species
Maullinia braseltonii P. Murúa, F.Goecke et S. Neuhauser 2017
Maullinia ectocarpii I. Maier, E. R. Parodi, R. Westermeier et D. G. Müller 2000
— Until Parodi et al., 2010, was theorised to have no resting spore.

References

 
 

Endomyxa
Cercozoa genera